Scoliacma heringi is a moth in the family Erebidae. It was described by Max Gaede in 1925. It is found in Papua New Guinea. The habitat consists of mountainous areas.

References

Moths described in 1925
Lithosiina